Corn Creek may refer to:

 Corn Creek (Millard County, Utah), a creek in Utah, United States
 Corn Creek Indian Farm, a farm in Millard County, Utah
 Corn Creek, Nevada, United States, an unincorporated community
 Corn Creek Campsite, a field station in the Desert National Wildlife Refuge
 Corn Creek, South Dakota, United States, an unincorporated community
 Corn Creek, Kentucky, the post office serving Wises Landing, Kentucky, and the creek for which it was named